Acacia cardiophylla, commonly known as West Wyalong wattle or Wyalong wattle, is an evergreen shrub that is endemic to eastern Australia.

Description
It can have an erect to spreading habit and often has multiple stems. The dark grey or mottled brown bark is smooth. It blooms between August and November producing inflorescences in groups to 6 to 21 in axillary racemes. After flowering firmly papery to thinly leathery seed pods that are  flat and straight to slightly curved form.

Distribution
Acacia cardiophylla is indigenous to central and southern New South Wales and is found Gilgandra in the north down to around Wagga Wagga in the south and extending to the Lake Cargelligo area in the west. It is found on stony hills and ridges in shallow rocky sandy soils as a part of Eucalyptus woodland and mallee communities. It has also now become naturalized in part of the Central Coast and Southern Tablelands regions.

See also
 List of Acacia species

References

External links

cardiophylla
Flora of New South Wales
Fabales of Australia